The Lycée du Parc is a public secondary school located in the sixth arrondissement of Lyon, France. Its name comes from the Parc de la Tête d'Or, one of Europe's largest urban parks, which is situated nearby.

It provides a lycée-level education and also offers classes préparatoires, or prépas, preparing students for entrance to the elite Grandes Écoles such as École Polytechnique, CentraleSupélec, École des Mines de Paris, ESSEC Business School, ESCP Business School, and HEC Paris.

The school was built on the site of the former Lunette des Charpennes, part of the Ceintures de Lyon system of fortifications built in the 19th century.

Famous alumni

 Louis Armand 
 Louis Althusser 
 Nathalie Arthaud 
 Louis Bancel 
 Christophe Barbier 
 Nicolas Baverez 
 René Belletto 
 Georges Bidault 
 Claude Bloch 
 Pierre Boutang 
 Bertrand Collomb 
 Gérard Collomb 
 Bruno Cotte 
 Antoine Culioli 
 Jean-Marie Domenach 
 Jacques Friedel 
 André Glucksmann 
 Jean Guitton 
 Jules Horowitz 
 Vladimir Jankélévitch 
 Jacques Julliard 
 Marc Lambron 
 Benoît Mandelbrot 
 Emmanuel Mounier 
 Louis Néel 
 Cédric O 
 Gilles Pélisson 
Nadia Ramirez 
 Jean-François Revel 
 Jean Reverzy 
 Étienne Roth 
 Éric-Emmanuel Schmitt 
 Gilbert Simondon 
 Jacques Soustelle 
 Jean-François Stévenin 
 Jean Vuarnet 
 Michel Zink
 Stéphane Vaillant

Famous teachers

 Terra Stenberg
 Brad Wilgien
 Jennifer Goodrich

See also

 Secondary education in France
 Education in France

References

6th arrondissement of Lyon
Parc
Education in Lyon
Buildings and structures in Lyon
Educational institutions established in 1914
1914 establishments in France